The 1988 Bavarian Tennis Championships was an Association of Tennis Professionals men's tennis tournament held in Munich, West Germany. The tournament was held from 2 May through 8 May 1988. Guillermo Pérez Roldán won his second consecutive title at the event.

Finals

Singles

 Guillermo Pérez Roldán defeated  Jonas Svensson 7–5, 6–3
 It was Pérez-Roldán's 1st title of the year and the 4th of his career.

Doubles

 Rick Leach /  Jim Pugh defeated  Alberto Mancini /  Christian Miniussi 7–6, 6–1
 It was Leach's 3rd title of the year and the 5th of his career. It was Pugh's 2nd title of the year and the 5th of his career.

References

External links 
 ATP tournament profile
 Official website

Bavarian Tennis Championships
Bavarian International Tennis Championships
1988 BMW Open
Bavarian Tennis Championships
Bavarian Tennis Championships
German